The Peyton Survey was a 1584 cadastral survey overseen by Christopher Peyton which mapped out areas of the province of Munster in the Kingdom of Ireland.

During the heavy fighting of the Desmond Rebellion many towns and villages in Munster had been destroyed and depopulated. The government wanted to urgently rebuild the province and using earlier, smaller plantations as a model intended to bring in settlers from England and other parts of Ireland. Peyton was charged with making a circuit of Munster, collecting evidence about lands which had recently been confiscated from local owners (largely Old English but with a significant minority of Gaelic Irish) and were at the disposal of the Crown to distribute to new owners.

Due to the brief time available before settlers were due to begin arriving, the survey was conducted very hastily. This led to a series of errors which in turn caused complex disputes between different settlers and the existing inhabitants which dragged on for many years despite later revising investigations.

A similar Bodley Survey took place in 1609 for the Plantation of Ulster. A more comprehensive Down Survey in the 1650s covered the whole of Ireland.

References

Bibliography
 MacCarthy-Morrogh, Michael. The Munster Plantation: English Migration to Southern Ireland, 1583-1641. Clarendon Press, 1986.

1584 in Ireland
Maps of Ireland
Geographic history of Ireland